Veenendaal is a municipality and a town in central Netherlands, located in the province of Utrecht. Veenendaal is the only population centre within its administrative borders.

History
The original village was founded in the middle of the 16th century as a peat colony from which it got its name. Veen is the Dutch word for fen and daal for dale. 

The village was administratively part of two nearby towns, which were themselves part of two different provinces of the Dutch Republic. The southern half belonged to Rhenen in Utrecht, the northeastern half to Ede in Guelders. In 1795, with the arrival of French troops in the country and inspired by the ideas of the French Revolution, the citizens declared their independence. When turmoil of the Napoleonic era was settled and the Netherlands was reformed as a monarchy, only the southern part would retain its independence. 

In the 19th century, wool and tobacco industry became Veenendaal's largest source of income. Big factories dominated the otherwise small rural town.

In 1855, Veenendaal was hit by a flood, which caused many residents to flee to Utrecht. A monument was erected near the railway station.

In 1960 the northern part of town, still controlled by Ede, was merged with the self-governing part of town. Further lands of Rhenen and also Renswoude were ceded to allow for new housing developments. The population grew rapidly from about 10,000 in the 1920s, to 23,000 in 1960, to the 68,000+ inhabitants of today. 

In 1997 the town was elected the greenest city in Europe and in 2004 of the Netherlands.

Like most Dutch cities, Veenendaal is well adapted to the high number of cyclists. A large network of bike paths make it convenient to cycle to various destinations and within the town, the bike is a popular mean of transportation. In 2000 and 2020, Veenendaal was chosen as Fietsstad of the year, recognised as being the top city for cycling in the Netherlands.

Religion
The city is known for being one of the bigger cities within the Dutch Bible Belt (together with Ede and Kampen), as it is inhabited by a considerable number (though not a majority) of conservative Protestants.

Notable residents

 Antonie Aris van de Loosdrecht (1885-1917) a Dutch missionary to the Dutch East Indies
 Kees Stip (1913-2001) a Dutch epigram poet 
 Bram van Ojik (born 1954) a Dutch politician, diplomat and activist
 Roelof Bisschop (born 1956) a Dutch historian and politician, Veenendaal municipal councillor 1986 to 2007
 Stef Bos (born 1961) a Dutch singer who lives in Cape Town, South Africa
 Frits Wester (born 1962) a Dutch journalist, political analyst on Dutch TV
 Jan Engelaar (born 1968) stage name DJ Jean,  a Dutch disc jockey
 Carla Dik-Faber (born 1971) a Dutch art historian and politician, Veenendaal municipal councillor 2003 to 2010
 Yuri Landman (born 1973) experimental musical instrument builder
 Bas Oskam (born 1980) stage name Noisecontrollers, a Dutch DJ and hardstyle music producer
 Sandra Beckerman (born 1983) a Dutch MP
 Joram Metekohy (born 1983) stage name Wildstylez, a Dutch hardstyle DJ and record producer
 Willem Rebergen (born 1985) stage name Headhunterz, a Dutch DJ and record producer
 Nicky Romero (born 1989) a Dutch musician, DJ, record producer and remixer

Sport 
 Linda Faber (born 1960) a former freestyle swimmer, competed at the 1976 Summer Olympics
 Marco van den Berg (born 1965) a Dutch retired basketball player and current coach
 Harry van der Meer (born 1973) a former water polo forward who participated in three Summer Olympics
 Barry Ditewig (born 1977) a Dutch football goalkeeper with over 400 club caps
 Botic van de Zandschulp (born 1995) a tennis player currently ranked first among Dutch men
 Dylan van Baarle Cyclist

Gallery

References

External links

Official website
Historical information and photographs

 
Municipalities of Utrecht (province)
Populated places in Utrecht (province)